The following is a list of notable art schools.

Accredited non-profit art and design colleges

 Adelaide Central School of Art
 Alberta College of Art and Design
 Art Academy of Cincinnati
 Art Center College of Design
 The Art Institute of Boston
 The Art Institute of Pittsburgh
 Bauhaus University Weimar
 California College of the Arts
 California Institute of the Arts
 Camberwell College of Arts
 Cleveland Institute of Art
 College for Creative Studies
 Columbia College Chicago
 Columbus College of Art and Design
 Cooper Union
 Corcoran College of Art and Design
 Cornish College of the Arts
 École cantonale d'art de Lausanne
 Emily Carr University of Art and Design
 Fashion Institute of Technology
 Government College of Art and Craft
 Grekov Odessa Art school
 Kansas City Art Institute
 Kendall College of Art and Design
 Laguna College of Art and Design
 Lyme Academy College of Fine Arts
 Maine College of Art
 Maryland Institute College of Art
 Massachusetts College of Art and Design
 Memphis College of Art
 Milwaukee Institute of Art & Design
 Minneapolis College of Art and Design
 Montserrat College of Art
 Moore College of Art and Design
 National Art School (Sydney, NSW, Australia)
 New Hampshire Institute of Art
 Nova Scotia College of Art and Design University
 Ontario College of Art and Design University
 Oregon College of Art & Craft
 Otis College of Art and Design
 Pacific Northwest College of Art
 Paris College of Art
 Parsons The New School for Design
 Pratt Institute
 Rhode Island School of Design
 Ringling College of Art and Design
 San Francisco Art Institute
 Savannah College of Art and Design
 School of the Art Institute of Chicago
 School of the Museum of Fine Arts, Boston
 Vermont College of Fine Arts
 Watkins College of Art, Design & Film

Other art schools

 Academy of Classical Design, North Carolina
 Art Academy of Cincinnati
 The Art Institute of Fort Lauderdale
 Art Students League of New York
 The Ashland Academy of Art
 Brooks Institute
 Capilano University
 College of the Arts, Windhoek
 Delaware College of Art and Design
 Digital Media Arts College
 European Academy of Art (EESAB)
 Famous Artists School
 Florida School of the Arts
 Hussian College, School of Art
 National Institute of Design
 New Image College of Fine Arts
 New Hampshire Institute of Art
 New York School of the Arts
 Northwest College of Art & Design
 The Jerusalem Studio School
 Mississippi School of the Arts
 Paier College of Art
 Painting School of Fine Arts
 Paris College of Art
 Pennsylvania Academy of the Fine Arts
 Pennsylvania Governor's School for the Arts
 Rochester Institute of Technology
 Rocky Mountain College of Art and Design
 Saldus Art School
 School of Visual Arts
 Joe Kubert School of Cartoon and Graphic Art
 Sessions College for Professional Design
 Sir Jamsetjee Jeejebhoy School of Art
 Sydney College of the Arts
 Tartu Art College
 University of Florida College of Fine Arts
 University of North Carolina School of the Arts
 Srishti School of Art Design and Technology
 University of the Arts (disambiguation)
 Valand School of Fine Arts
 Hong Kong Academy for Performing Arts
 Burren College of Art
 Osaka University of Arts
 Victorian College of the Arts
 Haliburton School of the Arts
 Indonesian Institute of the Arts, Denpasar, Bali
 Royal College of Art

Academy of Arts

 Academia de Artes (Mexico), an art institution founded in 1967/1968.
 Academy of Arts (Egypt), a large educational complex in Cairo.
 Academy of Arts and Academics (United States), a public high school dedicated to the arts, located in Springfield, Oregon.
 Academy of Art University (United States), a private school of art and design in San Francisco, California
 Bezalel Academy of Arts and Design (Israel), Israel's National College of art and Design, located in Jerusalem; school of architecture, fashion, ceramics, fine arts, multimedia, etc., founded in 1906.
 Chengdu Art Academy (China), an art institution based in Chengdu, Sichuan, and founded in 1980.
 China Academy of Art (China), an art school of mainland China, founded in 1928 by the government of the Republic of China.
 Cranbrook Academy of Art (United States), a school of architecture and design, founded in 1932, located in Bloomfield Hills, Michigan
 Estonian Academy of Arts (Estonia), a public arts school that offers education in arts at university level
 Iceland Academy of the Arts (Iceland), a public arts school that offers education in arts at university level
 Imperial Academy of Arts (Russia), a Russian art institution founded in 1757 which has played a variety of roles in the artistic life of Russia.
 Iranian Academy of the Arts (Iran), an organization whose aim is the preservation and development of Iranian and local arts
 New York Academy of Art (United States), located in New York City, it boasts the only graduate program which focuses on the human figure.
 Royal Academy of Arts (United Kingdom), an independent fine arts institution based in London.
 Royal Swedish Academy of Arts (Sweden), an independent organization acting to promote painting, sculpting, building and the other visual arts.
 Wulin Academy of Arts (China), an independent research institution and honorary society based in Hangzhou, dedicated to promoting studies of Chinese arts.

Academy of Fine Arts

 Jutland Art Academy, Aarhus (Denmark)
 Gerrit Rietveld Academie, Amsterdam (Netherlands)
 Academy of Fine Arts, Belgrade (Serbia)
 Academy of Fine Arts, Bologna (Italy)
 Academy of Fine Arts and Design, Bratislava (Slovakia)
 AKV St. Joost, Breda (Netherlands)
 Libera Accademia di Belle Arti, Brescia (Italy)
 Academy of Fine Arts, Calcutta (India)
 Chengdu Academy of Fine Arts, Chengdu (China)
 American Academy of Art, Chicago (United States)
 Royal Danish Academy of Fine Arts, Copenhagen (Denmark)
 Kunstakademie Düsseldorf, Düsseldorf (Germany)
 Academy of Fine Arts, Florence (Italy)
 Academy of Fine Arts, Helsinki (Finland)
 Hong Kong Academy of Fine Arts (Hong Kong)
 Bezalel Academy of Arts and Design, Jerusalem (Israel)
 Academy of Fine Arts, Karlsruhe (Germany)
 Jan Matejko Academy of Fine Arts, Kraków (Poland)
 Academy of Fine Arts and Design, Ljubljana (Slovenia)
 Maastricht Academy of Fine Arts, Maastricht (Netherlands)
 Brera Academy, Milan (Italy)
 Nuova Accademia di Belle Arti, Milan (Italy)
 Academy of Fine Arts, Munich (Germany)
 Accademia di Belle Arti di Napoli (Italy)
 New York Academy of Art, New York City (United States)
 Academy of Fine Arts, Nuremberg (Germany)
 Académie des Beaux-Arts, Paris (France)
 Accademia di Belle Arti di Perugia (Italy), founded in 1573, the second art academy of Europe.
 Pennsylvania Academy of the Fine Arts, Philadelphia (United States)
 Academy of Fine Arts, Prague (Czech Republic)
 Academy of Fine Arts of Quebec / L’Académie des Beaux-Arts de Québec
 Accademia di Belle Arti di Roma (Italy)
 Willem de Kooning Academy, Rotterdam (Netherlands)
 Nanyang Academy of Fine Arts (Singapore)
 Royal Academy of Art, The Hague (Netherlands)
 Academy of Fine Arts, Umeå (Sweden)
 Utrecht School of the Arts, Utrecht (Netherlands)
 Accademia di Belle Arti di Venezia Venice (Italy)
 Academy of Fine Arts, Verona (Italy)
 Academy of Fine Arts, Vienna (Austria)
 Academy of Fine Arts, Zagreb (Croatia)

University of the Arts
Includes institutions called the University of the Arts and those with very similar names:

 Alberta College of Art and Design, Calgary, Alberta, Canada
 Berlin University of the Arts
 Chugye University for the Arts
 Emily Carr University of Art and Design
 Falmouth University (formerly Falmouth College of Arts, an art, media and design school located in Penryn and Falmouth)
 Full Sail University
 Mimar Sinan Fine Arts University
 Norwich University of the Arts
 Nova Scotia College of Art and Design University
 University of Art and Design Lausanne
 Hochschule der Künste Berlin (Bern University of the Arts)
 Taipei National University of the Arts
 Tokyo University of the Arts
 University of the Arts Bremen
 University of the Arts London (federation of institutions)
 University of the Arts
 University of the Visual & Performing Arts
 Zurich University of the Arts

School of the Arts

The name of several schools (usually high schools) that are devoted to the fine arts, including:

 Baltimore School for the Arts
 Barbara Ingram School for the Arts
 Booker T. Washington High School for the Performing and Visual Arts
 Brooklyn High School of the Arts
 Cab Calloway School of the Arts
 Carver Center for Arts and Technology
 Chattanooga High School Center for Creative Arts
 Children's Studio School
 Coronado School of the Arts
 Cracow School of Art and Fashion Design
 Denver School of the Arts (grades 6–12)
 Douglas Anderson School of the Arts
 Dreyfoos School of the Arts
 Duke Ellington School of the Arts
 Governor's School for the Arts
 Harding Fine Arts Academy
 Joshibi High School of Art and Design
 Las Vegas Academy
 Lois Cowles Harrison Center for the Visual and Performing Arts
 Los Angeles County High School for the Arts
 Mississippi School of the Arts
 New World School of the Arts
 Northwest School of the Arts
 Oakland School for the Arts
 Orange County High School of the Arts
 Painting School of Fine Arts
 Perpich Center for Arts Education
 Pinellas County Center for the Arts
 Rochelle School of the Arts (PreK–8)
 Roosevelt School of the Arts
 San Francisco School of the Arts
 School of the Arts (Rochester, New York)
 Malvern College Egypt
 South Carolina Governor's School for the Arts & Humanities
 Charleston County School of the Arts
 Tacoma School of the Arts
 Vancouver School of Arts and Academics
 Victoria School of the Arts
 Walnut Hill School
 Osceola County School For The Arts

Similar school names

 The American Academy of Art
 Fiorello H. LaGuardia High School of Music & Art and Performing Arts
 High School of Art and Design
 Frank Sinatra School of the Arts
 High School of Graphic Communication Arts
 Idyllwild Arts Academy
 Interlochen Arts Academy
 Northcoast Preparatory and Performing Arts Academy
 Professional Performing Arts School
 San Diego School of Creative and Performing Arts
 Douglas Anderson School of the Arts
 AKI Academy for Art & Design

University Schools of the Arts
Arts programs within a university may also be called a "School of the Arts". Such programs include:

 Carnegie Mellon School of Art
 Columbia University School of the Arts
 Lamar Dodd School of Art
 Peck School of the Arts, University of Wisconsin–Milwaukee
 Cornell University College of Architecture, Art, and Planning
 Mason Gross School of the Arts
 Skunder Boghossian College of Performing and Visual Arts
 Syn Studio École d’art / School of Art

Artist-initiated schools

Some art schools have been initiated by artists; these may be designed to operate as traditional schools, or may themselves be considered art projects. 

 Black Mountain College (defunct)

See also 

 Art school
 Association of Independent Colleges of Art and Design
 Flint Institute of Arts
 Kunstgewerbeschule
 List of art schools in Europe
 List of art schools in Quebec
 National Association of Schools of Art and Design
 School of the Arts (disambiguation)
 National Association of Latino Arts and Culture

References